is a former Japanese football player.

Playing career
Hikichi was born in Kagoshima on May 2, 1983. After graduating from high school, he joined the J1 League club Júbilo Iwata with teammate Yuya Funatsu in 2002. However he did not play in any matches. In 2004, he moved to the J2 League club Shonan Bellmare with teammate Takuya Hara. He played several matches as defensive midfielder and right side back. In 2005, he moved to the newly promoted J2 League club, Tokushima Vortis. He played many matches as center back in 2005. In 2006, he became a regular player as defensive midfielder. However he did not play much in 2008. In August 2010, he moved to the Japan Football League club Zweigen Kanazawa. He retired at the end of the 2010 season.

Club statistics

References

External links

1983 births
Living people
Association football people from Kagoshima Prefecture
Japanese footballers
J1 League players
J2 League players
Japan Football League players
Júbilo Iwata players
Shonan Bellmare players
Tokushima Vortis players
Zweigen Kanazawa players
Association football midfielders
People from Kagoshima